Nu Caeli (ν Caeli) is a yellow-white hued star in the constellation Caelum. It has an apparent visual magnitude of 6.07, which indicates it is near the lower limit on brightness that is visible to the naked eye. According to the Bortle scale, the star can be viewed from dark suburban skies.

Houk (1978) listed a stellar classification of F2/3 V for Nu Caeli, which would indicate this is an F-type main-sequence star. In contrast, Malaroda (1975) assigned it to class F1 III-IV, which would suggest it is a more evolved F-type subgiant/giant transitional object. It is an estimated 880 million years old with 1.34 times the mass of the Sun.

A companion is listed in multiple star catalogues.

References

External links
 HR 1557 VizieR Bright Star Catalogue entry
 CCDM J04503-4119 Vizier Catalog of Components of Double and Multiple stars
 Nu Caeli Aladin Image
 Wikisky

F-type main-sequence stars
F-type subgiants
F-type giants
Caeli, Nu
Caelum
Durchmusterung objects
030985
022488
1557